Neopectinimura setiola is a moth in the family Lecithoceridae. It is found in Papua New Guinea.

The wingspan is 10 mm. The forewings are relatively short and densely covered with dark brown scales. The hindwings are orange grey and as wide as the forewings.

Etymology
The species name is derived from the Latin set (meaning bristle) and refers to the specialized bristles on the hindwing.

References

Moths described in 2010
setiola